Giulio Confalonieri (23 May 1896 - 29 June 1972) was an Italian musician, musicologist, composer and musical critic.

Between 1919 and 1920 he composed his first opera, "Rosaspina", which was eventually staged only in 1939. In 1921 he moved to Paris, where he became friend with Paul Dukas, and then to London, where he stayed until 1927 teaching piano,  performing as a concert pianist, and composing incidental music.

Returned to Italy, after a long period of isolation and study, in the late 1930s Confalonieri resumed his activity as composer, and in 1940, he started collaborating with the magazine  Settegiorni as a musical critic. In 1944 he lost the use of a leg because of an accident, and then focused on writing,  collaborating with a large number of publications, notably Il Giorno, Oggi and Epoca.

Confalonieri wrote several books including a History of Music and a children novel,  Il Cavalier Cuccagna. He won the Bagutta Prize in 1949 with Prigionia di un artista, a monography about Luigi Cherubini. He also directed the singing school of La Scala, founded and directed the "Ettore Pozzoli" International Piano Competition in Seregno, collaborated for years with the radio program Il Contemporaneo and in 1957-8 was lecturer of Italian opera at the  Cincinnati Conservatory.

Confalonieri died on 29 June 1972, aged 76, following a heart attack.

References

External links 

1896 births
1972 deaths
Conservatorio Giovanni Battista Martini alumni
Musicians from Milan
Italian classical composers
Italian male composers
Italian music critics
University of Cincinnati faculty
20th-century Italian musicologists
Italian male pianists
20th-century pianists
20th-century Italian male musicians